The index of physics articles is split into multiple pages due to its size.

To navigate by individual letter use the table of contents below.

J

J-PARC
J-coupling
J.D. Jackson
J. A. Ratcliffe
J. B. Gunn
J. Clarence Karcher
J. David Jackson
J. Doyne Farmer
J. Hans D. Jensen
J. J. Sakurai
J. J. Thomson
J. Kim Vandiver
J. Korean Phys. Soc.
J. Lamar Worzel
J. Lightwave Tech.
J. M. R. Parrondo
J. M. Robson
J. Richard Fisher
J. Richard Gott
J. Robert Oppenheimer
J/ψ meson
J0651
J1 J2 model
JADE (particle detector)
JAMIC
JD Jackson
JILA
JT-60
J D Jackson
Jaan Einasto
Jablonski diagram
Jack Cover
Jack Goldman
Jack Kilby
Jack Sarfatti
Jack Sound
Jack Steinberger
Jacketed vessel
Jacob Bekenstein
Jacob Leupold
Jacob Metius
Jacobi coordinates
Jacqueline Priestman
Jacques-Arsène d'Arsonval
Jacques Babinet
Jacques Beaulieu
Jacques Cassini
Jacques Charles
Jacques Curie
Jacques Distler
Jacques Lewiner
Jacques Prost
Jacques Rohault
Jacques Villain
Jae R. Ballif
Jagadeesh Moodera
Jagadish Chandra Bose
Jaguar (software)
Jahn–Teller effect
Jainendra K. Jain
Jakob Ackeret
Jakob Laub
Jamal Nazrul Islam
James A. Isenberg
James A. Yorke
James Alfred Ewing
James Arthur Pollock
James Atkinson (physicist)
James Ayscough
James B. Macelwane
James B. Pollack
James Binney
James Bjorken
James C. Keck
James Chadwick
James Challis
James Clerk Maxwell
James Cronin
James D. Watson
James David Forbes
James Dewar
James E. Boyd (scientist)
James E. Faller
James E. McDonald
James E. Muller
James E. Pringle
James Franck
James Gilbert Baker
James Glimm
James H. Stith
James H. Trainor
James Hansen
James Hartle
James Hillier
James Hough
James J. Kay
James Kakalios
James L. Tuck
James Lighthill
James Loudon
James M. Bardeen
James N. Hallock
James P. C. Southall
James Prescott Joule
James Rainwater
James Short (mathematician)
James Trefil
James Van Allen
James W. LaBelle
James W. York
Jamin interferometer
Jamming (physics)
Jan Ambjørn
Jan Burgers
Jan D. Achenbach
Jan Ingenhousz
Jan Kazimierz Danysz
Jan Smit (physicist)
Jan Sładkowski
Jan Zaanen
Jan Zawidzki
Jan Łopuszański (physicist)
Jane English
Janet S. Fender
Janez Strnad
Janna Levin
Jansky
Jansky noise
Janus laser
Janus particles
Janusz Andrzej Zakrzewski
Janwillem van den Berg
Japan Society for Composite Materials
Japan Society of Applied Physics
Japanese Journal of Applied Physics
Jaroslav Šafránek
Jarzynski equality
Jasper Kirkby
Java Analysis Studio
Javier Solana
Jayant Narlikar
Jayme Tiomno
Jaynes' principle
Jaynes–Cummings model
Jean-Antoine Nollet
Jean-Baptiste-Charles-Joseph Bélanger
Jean-Baptiste Biot
Jean-Baptiste Pérès
Jean-Charles de Borda
Jean-Daniel Colladon
Jean-Marc Lévy-Leblond
Jean-Marie Duhamel
Jean-Pierre Luminet
Jean-Pierre Vigier
Jean Audouze
Jean Baptiste Perrin
Jean Becquerel
Jean Bricmont
Jean Cabannes
Jean Charles Athanase Peltier
Jean Claude Eugène Péclet
Jean Emile Charon
Jean Ginibre
Jean Henri van Swinden
Jean Léonard Marie Poiseuille
Jean M. Bennett
Jean Morlet
Jean Picard
Jean Robieux
Jean Tatlock
Jean de Hautefeuille
Jean le Rond d'Alembert
Jeans instability
Jearl Walker
Jeff Schmidt (writer)
Jeffrey A. Harvey
Jeffrey Goldstone
Jeffrey Mandula
Jeffrey Satinover
Jeffrey Weeks (mathematician)
Jefimenko's equations
Jellium
Jens Eisert
Jens Frahm
Jens Martin Knudsen
Jeremiah P. Ostriker
Jeremy C. Smith (scientist)
Jeremy O'Brien
Jeremy Whitlock
Jerk (physics)
Jeroen van den Brink
Jerome Isaac Friedman
Jerome Wolken
Jerrold R. Zacharias
Jerry Goldstein
Jerry R. Ehman
Jerry Tersoff
Jerzy Plebański
Jerzy Pniewski
Jesse Beams
Jesse Ramsden
Jet (fluid)
Jet (particle physics)
Jet Propulsion Laboratory
Jet Propulsion Laboratory Science Division
Jet engine performance
Jet force
Jet noise
Jet quenching
Jiang Mianheng
Jiggle syphon
Jim Al-Khalili
Jim Bohlen
Jim Peebles
Jindřich Bačkovský
Joan Curran
Joan Feynman
Joan Hinton
Joan Vaccaro
Joanna Haigh
Joaquin Mazdak Luttinger
Jocelyn Bell Burnell
Jochen Heisenberg
Joe F. Thompson
Joe Farman
Joel H. Ferziger
Joel Lebowitz
Jog (dislocations)
Jogesh Pati
Johan Peter Holtsmark
Johan Wilcke
Johann Baptiste Horvath
Johann Christian Poggendorff
Johann Georg Halske
Johann Georg Tralles
Johann Georg von Soldner
Johann Gottlieb Nörremberg
Johann Heinrich Jakob Müller
Johann Jakob Balmer
Johann Jakob Müller
Johann Josef Loschmidt
Johann Nikuradse
Johann Rafelski
Johann Schweigger
Johann Tobias Mayer
Johann Wilhelm Hittorf
Johann Wilhelm Ritter
Johannes Bosscha
Johannes Browallius
Johannes Diderik van der Waals
Johannes Fischer
Johannes Franz Hartmann
Johannes Georg Bednorz
Johannes Hentschel
Johannes Juilfs
Johannes Kepler
Johannes Petrus Kuenen
Johannes Rydberg
Johannes Stark
John A. Dillon
John A. McClelland
John A. Sanderson
John A. Smolin
John Adam Fleming
John Adams (physicist)
John Aitken (meteorologist)
John Albery
John Alexander Simpson
John Ambrose Fleming
John Anderson (natural philosopher)
John Archibald Wheeler
John Backus (acoustician)
John Bardeen
John Baumgardner
John Brashear
John Bray (physician)
John Browning (scientific instrument maker)
John C. Baez
John C. Browne
John C. Mather
John C. Slater
John C. Taschner
John Canton
John Cardy
John Challifour
John Clarke (physicist)
John Clive Ward
John Cockcroft
John Cunningham McLennan
John Currie Gunn
John D. Anderson
John D. Barrow
John D. Kraus
John D. Lawson (scientist)
John D. Strong
John D. Wiley
John Dalton
John David Jackson (physicist)
John Desmond Bernal
John Dollond
John Ellis (physicist, born 1946)
John F. Allen (physicist)
John Fitzallen Moore
John Frederic Daniell
John Freely
John G. Anderson
John G. Cramer
John G. King (physicist)
John G. Taylor
John G. Trump
John Gamble Kirkwood
John H. Brodie
John H. Fremlin
John H. Gibbons (scientist)
John H. Hoffman
John H. Hubbell
John H. Lawrence
John H. Manley
John Hagelin
John Hall Gladstone
John Harnad
John Hartnett (physicist)
John Hasbrouck Van Vleck
John Hegarty (academic)
John Henry Dallmeyer
John Henry Michell
John Henry Poynting
John Henry Schwarz
John Herapath
John Herbert Chapman
John Heuser
John Hinch (mathematician)
John Holdren
John Hopfield
John Hopkinson
John Hopps (physicist)
John Howard (optometrist)
John Hubbard (physicist)
John Iliopoulos
John Jacob Bausch
John James Waterston
John Joly
John Joseph Montgomery
John Kanzius
John Kendrew
John Kerr (physicist)
John L. Hall
John L. Lumley
John L. Moll
John Larry Kelly, Jr.
John Leslie (physicist)
John Lighton Synge
John Linsley
John Loveday
John M. Cowley
John M. Dawson
John M. Greene
John M. Grunsfeld
John Maddox
John Madey
John Mallard
John Marburger
John Markert (physicist)
John Mauchly
John McCowan
John Milne
John Milton Miller
John Mitchell Nuttall
John Moffat (physicist)
John N. Bahcall
John Napier
John Nye (scientist)
John Oren Reed
John Papaloizou
John Pasta
John Paul Wild
John Pendry
John Perdew
John Pethica
John Playfair
John Poindexter
John Polkinghorne
John Pople
John Preskill
John Quincy Stewart
John R. Arthur, Jr.
John R. Dunning
John R. Kirtley
John R. Klauder
John R. Wiegand
John R. Winckler
John Randall (physicist)
John Rarity
John Reppy
John Rettaliata
John Reynolds (physicist)
John Riley Holt
John Robert Beyster
John Robert Schrieffer
John Robert Taylor
John Robert Woodyard
John Robison (physicist)
John Ross (chemist)
John Ruhl (physicist)
John S. Toll
John Scales Avery
John Scott Russell
John Sealy Townsend
John Steinhoff
John Stewart Bell
John Strutt, 3rd Baron Rayleigh
John Stuart Foster
John T. Hayward
John T. Houghton
John Tasker Henderson
John Thomas Romney Robinson
John Tuzo Wilson
John Tyndall
John V. Wehausen
John Vidale
John Vincent Atanasoff
John Viriamu Jones
John W. Hutchinson
John W. Miles
John Wikswo
John Winthrop (educator)
John Zeleny
John Ziman
John von Neumann
Johnsen–Rahbek effect
Johnson–Holmquist damage model
Johnson–Nyquist noise
Joint European Torus
Joint Institute for Nuclear Astrophysics
Joint Institute for Nuclear Research
Joint entropy
Joint quantum entropy
Jolly balance
Jon Orloff
Jonathan A. Jones
Jonathan Dowling
Jonathan Hare
Jonathan Homer Lane
Jonathan Lunine
Jonathan M. Dorfan
Jonathan Oppenheim
Jones calculus
Jook Walraven
Jordan and Einstein frames
Jordan–Wigner transformation
Jordin Kare
Jorg Wrachtrup
Jorge A. Swieca
Jorge Crispim Romão
Jorge E. Hirsch
Jorge Pullin
Jorge Sabato
Jos Engelen
Jose Acacio de Barros
Josef Finger
Josef Kozeny
Josef Lense
Josef Mattauch
Josef Meixner
Josef Schintlmeister
Joseph Black
Joseph Boussinesq
Joseph D. Sneed
Joseph Dwyer (physicist)
Joseph Fourier
Joseph Francisco
Joseph H. Eberly
Joseph H. Rush
Joseph Henry
Joseph Henry Keenan
Joseph Hooton Taylor, Jr.
Joseph Incandela
Joseph Jackson Lister
Joseph Jacobson
Joseph Kaplan
Joseph Larmor
Joseph Louis Gay-Lussac
Joseph Louis Lagrange
Joseph Lykken
Joseph Nordgren
Joseph Petavel
Joseph Plateau
Joseph Polchinski
Joseph Rotblat
Joseph Sauveur
Joseph Stefan
Joseph Swan
Joseph Sweetman Ames
Joseph Valentin Boussinesq
Joseph W. Goodman
Joseph Weber
Joseph Zähringer
Joseph von Fraunhofer
Josephson effect
Josephson phase
Josephson vortex
Joshua N. Goldberg
Joshua Silver
Josiah Willard Gibbs
Josip Križan
José Antonio Balseiro
José Enrique Moyal
José Fernando Ferreira Mendes
José Goldemberg
José Leite Lopes
José W. F. Valle
Joukowsky transform
Joule
Joule's laws
Joule heating
Joule per mole
Joule–Thomson effect
Jounce
Journal de Physique
Journal of Applied Physics
Journal of Biomedical Materials Research Part B
Journal of Biophotonics
Journal of Chemical Physics
Journal of Computational Acoustics
Journal of Computational Physics
Journal of Cosmology
Journal of Electroceramics
Journal of Experimental and Theoretical Physics
Journal of Fluid Mechanics
Journal of Geophysics and Engineering
Journal of High Energy Physics
Journal of Instrumentation
Journal of Lightwave Technology
Journal of Luminescence
Journal of Materials Science
Journal of Materials Science: Materials in Electronics
Journal of Materials Science: Materials in Medicine
Journal of Mathematical Physics
Journal of Nanoparticle Research
Journal of Nanoscience and Nanotechnology
Journal of Optics (IOP Publishing)
Journal of Optics A
Journal of Physics: Condensed Matter
Journal of Physics: Conference Series
Journal of Physics A
Journal of Physics A: General Physics
Journal of Physics A: Mathematical, Nuclear and General
Journal of Physics A: Mathematical and General
Journal of Physics B
Journal of Physics C
Journal of Physics D
Journal of Physics F
Journal of Physics G
Journal of Radioanalytical and Nuclear Chemistry
Journal of Rheology
Journal of Scientific Exploration
Journal of Sound and Vibration
Journal of Statistical Mechanics: Theory and Experiment
Journal of Statistical Physics
Journal of Thermal Analysis and Calorimetry
Journal of Vacuum Science and Technology
Journal of the Acoustical Society of America
Journal of the American Ceramic Society
Journal of the European Optical Society: Rapid Publications
Journal of the Korean Physical Society
Journal of the Optical Society of America
Journal of the Optical Society of America A
Journal of the Optical Society of America B
Journal of the Physical Society of Japan
Jovan Karamata
Jozef T. Devreese
João Magueijo
Joël Scherk
Jpn. J. Appl. Phys
Juan Carlos Campuzano
Juan Gualterio Roederer
Juan Ignacio Cirac Sasturain
Juan José Giambiagi
Juan Martín Maldacena
Juan Pablo Paz
Jules-Émile Verschaffelt
Jules Jamin
Jules Violle
Julian Barbour
Julian Schwinger
Julio César Gutiérrez Vega
Julio Gea-Banacloche
Julio Navarro (astrophysicist)
Julius Bartels
Julius Edgar Lilienfeld
Julius H. Taylor
Julius Plücker
Julius Wess
Julius Wilhelm Gintl
Julius von Mayer
Jun-ichi Nishizawa
Jun Kondo
Junction temperature
Jupiter mass
Jurij Vega
Juris Upatnieks
Justus Mühlenpfordt
János Kertész
Józef Bem
Józef Zawadzki (chemist)
Józef Łukaszewicz
Jørg Tofte Jebsen
Jürg Fröhlich
Jürgen Ehlers
Jürgen Warnatz
Jōyō (nuclear reactor)

Indexes of physics articles